Association football – commonly known as football (or soccer in the United States and Canada)) – is a popular sport in French Guiana.  
The Ligue de Football de la Guyane – the region's national football governing body – runs the men's national team, organizes the annual Coupe Guyane tournament as well as administering the region's professional leagues the French Guiana Régional 1 and French Guiana Régional 2 divisions.  As an overseas department of France and member of the French Football Federation, teams are eligible to participate in the Coupe de France.  As members of Caribbean Football Union teams are eligible for the Caribbean Club Championship and the region's membership in CONCACAF allows teams to participate in that organizations club and national team competitions.  French Guiana however is not a member of FIFA and is therefore ineligible to play in the World Cup.

History
Football was introduced to the region during the early 20th Century.  The men's national team played its first friendly against Dutch Guiana (now Suriname) in 1936 losing 1 to 3.  They met Dutch Guiana again for their first competitive match in the Coupe des Caraibes, losing again 2:4.  Known as Yana Dòkò, the team gained its first victory in a competitive match against British Guiana(now Guyana) in October 1948 with a score of 3:2.

Despite being geographically in the subcontinent of South America, the local authorities chose to participate in the competition where most of the countries and dependent territories of the Caribbean area are located.  The Ligue de Football de la Guyane was founded in 1962 has been affiliated to the FFF since 1963 and a member of the Caribbean Football Union since 1978.  French Guiana gained full membership to CONCACAF in 2013 having been an associate member since 1978.

League system
The French Guiana football league system is a series of interconnected leagues for club football including the top two professional leagues in the department.  The highest tier of men's football, the French Guiana Régional 1, is equivalent to the sixth tier of football in France.  There are twelve participants in Régional 1, with teams finishing in the two bottom spots being relegated to the Régional 2.

Football stadiums in French Guiana

References

Football in French Guiana